PO. COYO PT. or commonly called PO Coyo is one of the bus companies from Pekalongan, Central Java. The bus serves passengers from Semarang to Cirebon and also Cirebon to Malang. This company is one of the oldest bus companies in Indonesia.

History 

COYO, formerly named TJOJO, began operating around 1950 with the fleet at that time Ford. Had formed a bus route in Central Java routes. But for now the Coyo bus departure schedule is not as busy as before because of the lack of passengers and lost to other modes of transportation such as trains or private vehicles.

This company is also almost collapsed because there are no family members in Indonesia who want to continue the business of the owner. Until finally the owner's son who was in America was called Untung, to continue the business. According to the owner himself who said why no one wanted to continue this business, because the passenger transportation business needed large capital but the benefits gained were small and capital was returned. long.

Routes and classes

PO Coyo currently serves routes in several cities on Java, with two classes of buses, including:

 Semarang, Tegal, Cirebon - Economy PATAS AC
 Cirebon, Surabaya, Malang - Super Executive seat configuration 2-1

Fleet 

PO Coyo currently has dozens of bus fleets, among them :

Current fleet 

 Hino Motors
 Hyundai

Former fleet 

 Ford
 Mercedes-Benz
 Mitsubishi

References 

Bus companies of Indonesia